Earl Van Dyke (July 8, 1930 – September 18, 1992) was an American soul musician, most notable as the main keyboardist for Motown Records' in-house Funk Brothers band during the late 1960s and early 1970s.

Career
Van Dyke, who was born in Detroit, Michigan, United States, was preceded as keyboardist and bandleader of the Funk Brothers by Joe Hunter. In the early 1960s, he also recorded as a jazz organist with saxophonists Fred Jackson and Ike Quebec for the Blue Note label.

Besides his work as the session keyboardist on Motown hits such as "Bernadette" by The Four Tops, "I Heard It Through the Grapevine" by Marvin Gaye and "Runaway Child, Running Wild" by The Temptations, Van Dyke performed with a small band as an opening act for several Motown artists, and released instrumental singles and albums himself. Several of Van Dyke's recordings feature him playing keys over the original instrumental tracks for Motown hits; others are complete covers of Motown songs.

His 1967 hit "6 by 6" is a much-loved stomper on the Northern soul music scene. He was nicknamed "Big Funk", and "Chunk o Funk".

Van Dyke played the Steinway grand piano, the Hammond B-3 organ, the Wurlitzer electric piano, the Fender Rhodes, and the celeste and harpsichord. He played a toy piano for the introduction of the Temptations' hit, "It's Growing". His musical influences included Tommy Flanagan, Hank Jones, and Barry Harris.

Van Dyke died of prostate cancer in Detroit, Michigan, at the age of 62.

Discography

Singles
Soul (Motown) releases
1964: "Soul Stomp"
1965: "All For You"*
1965: "I Can't Help Myself (Sugar Pie, Honey Bunch)"*
1965: "The Flick (Part II)"*
1967: "6 By 6"**
1969: "Run Away Child, Running Wild"

(*) billed as "Earl Van Dyke & the Soul Brothers" (the billed name of the Funk Brothers band was changed by Motown head Berry Gordy, as he disliked the connotation of the word "funk")

(**) billed as "Earl Van Dyke & the Motown Brass"

Albums
Soul (Motown) releases
1965: That Motown Sound (Earl Van Dyke & the Soul Brothers)
1970: The Earl of Funk (Earl Van Dyke Live)

As sideman
With Fred Jackson
Hootin' 'n Tootin' (Blue Note, 1962)
With Ike Quebec
The Complete Blue Note 45 Sessions (Blue Note, 1962)

Filmography

References

External links

1930 births
1992 deaths
African-American pianists
American pop pianists
American male pianists
The Funk Brothers members
American soul keyboardists
American soul musicians
Motown artists
American session musicians
P-Funk members
Musicians from Detroit
Northern soul musicians
Deaths from prostate cancer
Deaths from cancer in Michigan
20th-century American pianists
American male organists
American bandleaders
Rhythm and blues pianists
20th-century American keyboardists
20th-century American male musicians